Urban Milwaukee is an online daily that provides real estate, politics, arts and entertainment news about Milwaukee, Wisconsin.  The site features approximately 5-10 articles a day focusing on city council hearings, investigative reports, real-estate developments and entertainment news. focusing on dining, arts and entertainment, movies, music and sports.

History 
Urban Milwaukee was founded in 2008 by Jeramey Jannene and Dave Reid. Bruce Murphy joined Urban Milwaukee as their editor in 2012. Bruce Murphy was formerly the editor of Milwaukee Magazine and a senior reporter at the Milwaukee Journal Sentinel. The publication acquired Third Coast Daily in 2013. Their offices are located at 755 N. Milwaukee Street in the historic Colby Abbot Building. Urban Milwaukee also operates a small retail outlet which sells Milwaukee themed souvenirs and gifts. 

Urban Milwaukee and its writer have won a number of Milwaukee Press Club awards. Its coverage of city government and other Milwaukee issues has been recognized by other local and national outlets. As of 2013, the site had 150,000 monthly visits. 

The publication will often post stories from Wisconsin Public Radio, Milwaukee Neighborhood News Service and the Wisconsin Examiner.

Reporters and contributors
Jeramey Jannene
Bruce Murphy
Graham Kilmer
Michael Holloway
Steven Walters
Bruce Thompson
Rose Balistreri
Tom Bamberger

References

External links
Official Website

2008 establishments in Wisconsin
Local interest magazines published in the United States
Online magazines published in the United States
Magazines established in 2008
Magazines published in Wisconsin
Mass media in Milwaukee